The Anhinga Trail is a short trail (about 0.4 miles) in the Everglades National Park.  Located 4 miles from the park entrance, it starts at the Royal Palm Visitor Center.  The trail is a paved walkway and a boardwalk over Taylor Slough, a freshwater sawgrass marsh.  Abundant wildlife is visible from the trail, including alligators, turtles, anhingas, herons, and egrets. It is one of the most popular trails in the park. On November 5, 1996, it was added to the U.S. National Register of Historic Places.

In 2003, tourists witnessed a fight between an alligator and a Burmese python which went on for 24 hours, until a larger alligator joined the fight and the snake escaped.  Video and news coverage of the fight was widespread and brought attention to the spread of the python, an invasive species, in the Everglades.

References

Bibliography

External links

 Anhinga Trail – Everglades National Park – National Park Service
 Dade County listings at National Register of Historic Places
 Everglades National Park Map at National Park Service
 The Anhinga Trail at Birding America
 Anhinga Trail, Everglades National Park, Homestead Florida at Naturescapes.net
 Aerial close-up of Anhinga Trail

Gallery

National Register of Historic Places in Miami-Dade County, Florida
National Register of Historic Places in Everglades National Park